Candy Hsu (born 10 February 1998 in Kaohsiung, Taiwan) is a Taiwanese singer-songwriter, actress and record producer.
She writes, composes her own songs, and plays many instruments including piano, saxophone and guitar.

Biography 
Candy Hsu's parents are professional musicians.

In 2006, 8-year-old Candy entered a singer-songwriter contest with the song "Vanilla Kitty", that she composed at the age of 6, in 2004. The large competition, called Chunghwa Telecom MOD Star Contest, made her a star. After the 6 long months of preliminaries, semi-finals and finals, Candy Hsu was declared winner.

Candy's first official album, also entitled "Vanilla Kitty", was released by Avex Taiwan on 29 February 2008. All the songs on the album were written by her.  "Vanilla Kitty" topped sales charts.

In January 2012, Candy Hsu started filming in her debut movie, Kidnapping of a Big Star, directed by Zhang Jiabei, notably the director of Midnight Beating. She has a leading role in it, playing alongside Daniel Chan and Kristy Yeung.

As of September 2012, she was endorsing the trade fair Music China Shanghai, that would take place from 11 to 14 October.

Discography

Albums 
 Vanilla Kitty (Avex Taiwan, 29 February 2008)
 Angel (Pure Music, 15 July 2010)

EPs 
 "Yongyuan De Chengnuo" (with Devin Wu) (Pure Music, 4 July 2011)

Music videos 
 2008
 "Candy Box"
 "Vanilla Kitty"
 "Xingfu De Maopao"
 2010
 "Tianshi Zhi Lian"
 "Sui Boli"
 "Ya Da Di"
 2011
 "Yongyuan De Chengnuo"

Filmography

Movies

References

External links

 Official website by Avex Taiwan 
 Pure Music profile 
 Pure Music's official blog 
 Xu Yahan story by eNet 
 Candy Hsu "Tianshi Zhi Lian" music video  – Pure Music official site

1998 births
Living people
Child singers
Taiwanese child actresses
Taiwanese singer-songwriters
Taiwanese film actresses
Actresses from Kaohsiung
21st-century Taiwanese actresses
Musicians from Kaohsiung
Writers from Kaohsiung
21st-century Taiwanese singers
21st-century Taiwanese women singers